Stenella is a genus of anamorphic fungi in the family Mycosphaerellaceae. The widespread genus contained about 155 species in 2008.

Species 
As accepted by Species Fungorum;

Stenella aegles 
Stenella africana 
Stenella alyxiae 
Stenella anomoconis 
Stenella antillana 
Stenella araguata 
Stenella argyreiae 
Stenella ateramni 
Stenella canavaliae-roseae 
Stenella capparis 
Stenella caryotae-urentis 
Stenella cassiigena 
Stenella cedrelae 
Stenella chandleri 
Stenella coffeae 
Stenella constricta 
Stenella cubensis 
Stenella davillae 
Stenella doliiformis 
Stenella elaeodendri 
Stenella fagraeae 
Stenella flacourtiicola 
Stenella grewiae 
Stenella laurina 
Stenella liabicola 
Stenella lomatiae 
Stenella mahoniae 
Stenella myrsines 
Stenella novae-zelandiae 
Stenella osyridina 
Stenella palmicola 
Stenella prinsepiae 
Stenella pseudoramularia 
Stenella psychotriae 
Stenella pterocarpi 
Stenella rhododendricola 
Stenella rufescens 
Stenella taiwanensis 
Stenella triseptata 
Stenella tristaniae 
Stenella uniformis 
Stenella variabilis 
Stenella vermiculata

Former species
As accepted by Species Fungorum.
Assume if not mentioned all within Mycosphaerellaceae family

S. adeniae  = Zasmidium adeniae 
S. aeglicola  = Zasmidium aeglicola 
S. agavicola  = Zasmidium agavicola 
S. alocasiae  = Zasmidium alocasiae 
S. alpiniae  = Zasmidium alpiniae 
S. anamirtae  = Zasmidium anamirtae 
S. annonaceae  = Zasmidium annonaceae 
S. anthuriicola  = Zasmidium anthuriicola 
S. aphanamixtidis  = Zasmidium aphanamixidis 
S. araliae  = Zasmidium araliae 
S. aspiliae  = Zasmidium aspiliae 
S. aucklandica  = Zasmidium aucklandicum 
S. australiensis  = Zasmidium australiense 
S. bauhiniae  = Zasmidium bauhiniae 
S. bischofiae-javanicae  = Zasmidium bischofiae-javanicae 
S. bougainvilleae  = Zasmidium bougainvilleae 
S. brideliicola  = Zasmidium brideliicola 
S. browneicola  = Zasmidium browneicola 
S. buteae  = Zasmidium buteae 
S. canavaliae  = Zasmidium canavaliae 
S. canthii  = Zasmidium canthii 
S. capparacearum  = Zasmidium capparacearum 
S. capparicola  = Zasmidium capparicola 
S. capparicola  = Zasmidium capparigenum 
S. capparigena  = Zasmidium capparigenum 
S. caryotae  = Zasmidium caryotae 
S. caseariicola  = Zasmidium caseariicola 
S. cassiae  = Zasmidium cassiae 
S. cassiae  = Neocosmospora parva, Nectriaceae
S. cassiae-fistulae  = Zasmidium cassiae 
S. cassiae-torae  = Zasmidium cassiae-torae 
S. cassiicola  = Zasmidium cassiicola 
S. cassiigena  = Zasmidium cassiae-occidentalis 
S. celastri  = Zasmidium celastri 
S. cercestidis  = Zasmidium cercestidis 
S. cercestidis  = Zasmidium deightonianum 
S. ceropegiae  = Zasmidium ceropegiae 
S. cestri  = Zasmidium cestri 
S. cinnamomi  = Zasmidium cinnamomi 
S. citrigrisea  = Zasmidium citrigriseum 
S. colocasiae  = Zasmidium colocasiae 
S. crotalariicola  = Zasmidium crotalariicola 
S. cuneaegena  = Zasmidium cuneigenum 
S. cynanchi  = Zasmidium cynanchi 
S. cyrtopodii  = Zasmidium cyrtopodii 
S. deightoniana  = Zasmidium deightonianum 
S. dianellae  = Zasmidium dianellae 
S. dianthi  = Zasmidium dianthi 
S. dichanthii  = Zasmidium dichanthii 
S. dioscoreicola  = Zasmidium dioscoreicola 
S. diospyri  = Zasmidium diospyri 
S. diospyrigena  = Zasmidium diospyrigenum 
S. dracaenae  = Zasmidium dracaenae 
S. ehretiigena  = Zasmidium ehretiigenum 
S. embeliae  = Verrucisporota embeliae 
S. embeliae  = Verrucisporota embeliae 
S. emblicae  = Zasmidium emblicae 
S. eriolobi  = Zasmidium eriolobi 
S. erythroxyli-campestris  = Zasmidium erythroxyli-campestris 
S. erythroxylicola  = Zasmidium erythroxylicola 
S. erythroxyli-suberosi  = Zasmidium erythroxyli-suberosi 
S. eucalypti  = Pseudozasmidium eucalypti 
S. eugeniicola  = Zasmidium eugeniicola 
S. euphorbiicola  = Zasmidium euphorbiicola 
S. extremorum  = Zasmidium extremorum 
S. fabacearum  = Zasmidium fabacearum 
S. ficina  = Zasmidium ficinum 
S. flacourtiae  = Zasmidium flacourtiae 
S. gahniae  = Zasmidium gahniae 
S. garugae  = Zasmidium garugae 
S. gongronematis  = Zasmidium gongronematis 
S. gorakhpurensis  = Zasmidium gorakhpurense 
S. guazumae  = Zasmidium guazumae 
S. gynoxidicola  = Cladosporium gynoxidicola, Cladosporiaceae
S. gynurae  = Zasmidium gynurae 
S. haematitica  = Zasmidium haematiticum 
S. heterophragmatis  = Zasmidium heterophragmatis 
S. himatanthi  = Zasmidium himatanthi 
S. hippocratiae  = Zasmidium hippocratiae 
S. hirtellae  = Zasmidium hirtellae 
S. holophaea  = Zasmidium holophaeum 
S. hymenocallidis  = Zasmidium hymenocallidis 
S. hyptiantherae  = Zasmidium hyptiantherae 
S. ichnocarpicola  = Zasmidium ichnocarpicola 
S. ipomoeae-stoloniferae  = Zasmidium ipomoeae-stoloniferae 
S. iteae  = Zasmidium iteae 
S. kansensis  = Zasmidium kansense 
S. kydiae  = Zasmidium kydiae 
S. lamiacearum  = Zasmidium lamiacearum 
S. lantanae  = Zasmidium lantanae 
S. leucothoes  = Zasmidium leucothoes 
S. liliacearum  = Zasmidium smilacicola 
S. litseae-glutinosae  = Zasmidium litseae-glutinosae 
S. lonicericola  = Zasmidium lonicericola 
S. lygodii  = Pseudocercospora lygodiigena 
S. lythri  = Zasmidium lythri 
S. maesae  = Zasmidium maesae 
S. manihotis  = Zasmidium manihotis 
S. marasasii  = Zasmidium marasasii 
S. maughaniae  = Pseudocercospora maughaniae 
S. meynae-laxiflorae  = Zasmidium meynae-laxiflorae 
S. micheliae  = Zasmidium micheliae 
S. millettiae  = Zasmidium millettiae 
S. mirzapurensis  = Zasmidium mirzapurense 
S. mitellae  = Zasmidium mitellae 
S. murrayae  = Zasmidium murrayae 
S. musae  = Zasmidium musae 
S. musicola  = Zasmidium musicola 
S. myxa  = Zasmidium myxum 
S. naucleae  = Zasmidium naucleae 
S. ocoteae  = Zasmidium ocoteae 
S. oliganthis  = Zasmidium oliganthis 
S. oligoneuri  = Zasmidium oligoneuri 
S. orchidacearum  = Zasmidium orchidacearum 
S. oroxylicola  = Zasmidium oroxylicola 
S. oxycocci  = Zasmidium oxycocci 
S. parkii  = Pseudozasmidium parkii 
S. paulliniae  = Zasmidium paulliniae 
S. pavoniae  = Zasmidium pavoniae 
S. pentatropidis  = Zasmidium pentatropidis 
S. periandrae  = Zasmidium periandrae 
S. persicae  = Zasmidium persicae 
S. pithecellobii  = Passalora pithecellobii 
S. pittospori  = Zasmidium pittospori 
S. plectroniae  = Zasmidium plectroniae 
S. plumeriae  = Zasmidium plumeriae 
S. pluriseptata  = Sirosporium pluriseptatum 
S. polyalthiae  = Zasmidium polyalthiae 
S. praelonga  = Zasmidium praelongum 
S. prosopidis  = Zasmidium prosopidis 
S. pseudoparkii  = Zasmidium pseudoparkii 
S. pterocarpigena  = Zasmidium pterocarpigenum 
S. queenslandica  = Zasmidium queenslandicum 
S. quitensis  = Zasmidium quitense 
S. rhododendri  = Zasmidium rhododendri 
S. rubiacearum  = Zasmidium rubiacearum 
S. rutacearum  = Zasmidium rutacearum 
S. salicis  = Zasmidium salicis 
S. sardoa  = Zasmidium sardoum 
S. satpurensis  = Zasmidium satpurense 
S. schefflerae  = Zasmidium schefflerae 
S. schisandrae  = Zasmidium schisandrae 
S. schubertiana  = Zasmidium schubertianum 
S. scleriae  = Zasmidium scleriae 
S. shoreae  = Zasmidium shoreae 
S. shoreae  = Zasmidium shoreicola 
S. shoreicola  = Zasmidium shoreicola 
S. simaroubacearum  = Zasmidium simaroubacearum 
S. sinuosogeniculata  = Zasmidium sinuosogeniculatum 
S. smilacicola  = Zasmidium smilacicola 
S. smilacis  = Zasmidium smilacis 
S. smilacis-macrophyllae  = Zasmidium smilacis-macrophyllae 
S. solidaginis  = Zasmidium solidaginis 
S. sonapathariensis  = Zasmidium sonapathariense 
S. sonneratiae  = Zasmidium sonneratiae 
S. stemodiicola  = Zasmidium stemodiicola 
S. stephaniae  = Zasmidium stephaniae 
S. stipae  = Zasmidium stipae 
S. subsanguinea  = Zasmidium subsanguineum 
S. telosmae  = Zasmidium telosmae 
S. tephrosiae  = Zasmidium tephrosiae 
S. tiliacorae  = Zasmidium tiliacorae 
S. trijugae  = Zasmidium trijugae 
S. vangueriae  = Zasmidium vangueriae 
S. vexans  = Zasmidium vexans 
S. weberi  = Zasmidium weberi 
S. wendlandiicola  = Zasmidium wendlandiicola 
S. wikstroemiae  = Zasmidium wikstroemiae 
S. xenoparkii  = Zasmidium xenoparkii 
S. xeromphigena  = Zasmidium xeromphigenum

References 

 
Fungal plant pathogens and diseases
Mycosphaerellaceae genera
Taxa named by Hans Sydow